Than Aung is a former Minister for the Ministry of Health of Myanmar (Burma). He previously served as Deputy Minister for Ministry of Health, Member of Naypyidaw Council and director of Myanmar Army Medical Corps.

Criticism
He is a former military physician and close to former military general Than Shwe. His appointment of the military officers to the Ministry of Health in August 2015 was faced with a strong opposition from medical fellows, known as Black Ribbon Movement Myanmar.

References

Burmese military personnel
People from Yangon
Burmese military doctors
Living people
Union Solidarity and Development Party politicians
Health ministers of Myanmar
Year of birth missing (living people)